Wilford Village is a tram stop on the Nottingham Express Transit (NET) network in the city of Nottingham. The stop takes its name from the village of Wilford on the south bank of the River Trent, and is situated between that village and the Wilford Toll Bridge that takes the tramway across the river. It is situated on reserved track and comprises a single island platform situated between the tracks. The stop is on line 2 of the NET, from Phoenix Park via the city centre to Clifton, and trams run at frequencies that vary between 4 and 8 trams per hour, depending on the day and time of day.

Wilford Village opened on 25 August 2015, along with the rest of NET's phase two.

References

External links

Nottingham Express Transit stops
Railway stations in Great Britain opened in 2015